In order theory, a branch of mathematics, a linear extension of a partial order is a total order (or linear order) that is compatible with the partial order. As a classic example, the lexicographic order of totally ordered sets is a linear extension of their product order.

Definitions

Linear extension of a partial order 
A partial order is a reflexive, transitive and antisymmetric relation.

  is a total order,  and 
 For every  if  then  

It is that second property that leads mathematicians to describe  as extending 

Alternatively, a linear extension may be viewed as an order-preserving bijection from a partially ordered set  to a chain  on the same ground set.

Linear extension of a preorder 
A preorder is a reflexive and transitive relation. The difference between a preorder and a partial-order is that a preorder allows two different items to be considered "equivalent", that is, both  and  hold, while a partial-order allows this only when . A relation  is called a linear extension of a preorder   if:

  is a total preorder,  and 
 For every  if  then  , and
 For every  if  then  . Here,  means " and not ".
The difference between these definitions is only in condition 3. When the extension is a partial order, condition 3 need not be stated explicitly, since it follows from condition 2. Proof: suppose that  and not . By condition 2, . By reflexivity,  "not " implies that . Since  is a partial order,  and  imply "not ". Therefore, . 

However, for general preorders, condition 3 is needed to rule out trivial extensions. Without this condition, the  preorder by which all elements are equivalent ( and  hold for all pairs x,y) would be an extension of every preorder.

Order-extension principle 

The statement that every partial order can be extended to a total order is known as the order-extension principle. A proof using the axiom of choice was first published by Edward Marczewski (Szpilrajin) in 1930. Marczewski writes that the theorem had previously been proven by Stefan Banach, Kazimierz Kuratowski, and Alfred Tarski, again using the axiom of choice, but that the proofs had not been published.

There is an analogous statement for preorders: every preorder can be extended to a total preorder. This statement was proved by Hansson.

In modern axiomatic set theory the order-extension principle is itself taken as an axiom, of comparable ontological status to the axiom of choice. The order-extension principle is implied by the Boolean prime ideal theorem or the equivalent compactness theorem, but the reverse implication doesn't hold.

Applying the order-extension principle to a partial order in which every two elements are incomparable shows that (under this principle) every set can be linearly ordered. This assertion that every set can be linearly ordered is known as the ordering principle, OP, and is a weakening of the well-ordering theorem. However, there are models of set theory in which the ordering principle holds while the order-extension principle does not.

Related results 

The order extension principle is constructively provable for  sets using topological sorting algorithms, where the partial order is represented by a directed acyclic graph with the set's elements as its vertices. Several algorithms can find an extension in linear time. Despite the ease of finding a single linear extension, the problem of counting all linear extensions of a finite partial order is #P-complete; however, it may be estimated by a fully polynomial-time randomized approximation scheme. Among all partial orders with a fixed number of elements and a fixed number of comparable pairs, the partial orders that have the largest number of linear extensions are semiorders.

The order dimension of a partial order is the minimum cardinality of a set of linear extensions whose intersection is the given partial order; equivalently, it is the minimum number of linear extensions needed to ensure that each critical pair of the partial order is reversed in at least one of the extensions.

Antimatroids may be viewed as generalizing partial orders; in this view, the structures corresponding to the linear extensions of a partial order are the basic words of the antimatroid.

Algebraic combinatorics 

Counting the number of linear extensions of a finite poset is a common problem in algebraic combinatorics. This number is given by the leading coefficient of the order polynomial multiplied by  

Young tableau can be considered as linear extensions of a finite order-ideal in the infinite poset  and they are counted by the hook length formula.

References

Order theory